Ethanolamine-O-sulfate (EOS) is an ester of sulfuric acid and ethanolamine. EOS is a GABA transaminase inhibitor which prevents the metabolism of GABA.  It is used as a biochemical tool in studies involving GABA.

EOS is also a diuretic and an anticonvulsant.

References

Anticonvulsants
Diuretics
GABA transaminase inhibitors
Sulfate esters